"We Didn't See a Thing" is a duet recorded by Ray Charles and George Jones.  The Gary Gentry composition was produced by Billy Sherrill and features Chet Atkins on guitar.

Background
Charles had released the groundbreaking albums Modern Sounds in Country and Western Music in 1962 for ABC and in 1984 returned to the genre again by cutting duets with some of country music's biggest stars, including Willie Nelson, Johnny Cash, Ricky Skaggs, and Hank Williams, Jr.  "We Didn't See a Thing" is the only duet that Charles and Jones - each widely hailed as two American vocal geniuses - ever recorded together.   In addition to Atkins, the song also features steel guitarist Buddy Emmons.  The up-tempo "buddy song," which pokes fun at Charles' blindness - something that the pianist had often done himself - rose to #6 on the Billboard country singles chart.  The song was also issued on the 1984 Jones album By Request.  The pair performed the song at the Academy of Country Music Awards the same year.

Charts

References

1984 singles
George Jones songs
Ray Charles songs
1983 songs
Songs written by Gary Gentry (songwriter)
Song recordings produced by Billy Sherrill
Columbia Records singles